Eriah Joseph Hayes (born July 7, 1988) is an American former professional ice hockey player. He played in the National Hockey League (NHL) with the San Jose Sharks.

Playing career
He played junior hockey with the Waterloo Blackhawks. Hayes attended Minnesota State University, Mankato where he played four seasons (2009–2013) of NCAA Division I hockey with the Minnesota State Mavericks, registering 52 goals, 44 assists, 96 points, and 245 penalty minutes in 153 games.

On April 5, 2013, the San Jose Sharks signed Hayes as a free agent to an NHL entry-level contract. On January 3, 2014, after playing 36 AHL games, Hayes was recalled from the Worcester Sharks to join San Jose; however, a winter storm prevented him from joining the NHL team in time for the January 4, 2014 match against the Colorado Avalanche, but he was on the ice with San Jose on January 6, 2014, to make his NHL debut in a 3–2 shootout win over the home team Chicago Blackhawks. On January 30 against the Calgary Flames, Hayes scored his first NHL goal against Karri Ramo.

On October 11, 2014, Sharks General Manager Doug Wilson announced that Hayes has been reassigned to Worcester.

On August 13, 2015, Hayes signed as a free agent a one-year contract with the Chicago Wolves of the AHL.

On October 3, 2017, he announced on his Twitter account that he retired from hockey.

Career statistics

Awards and honors

References

External links

1988 births
American men's ice hockey right wingers
Chicago Wolves players
Ice hockey players from Minnesota
Living people
Minnesota State Mavericks men's ice hockey players
People from La Crescent, Minnesota
San Jose Sharks players
Undrafted National Hockey League players
Waterloo Black Hawks players
Worcester Sharks players

Minnesota State University, Mankato alumni